Héctor Lastra (Buenos Aires, Argentina, 1943 – July 16, 2006) was a writer from Argentina.

Works
Cuentos de mármol y hollín (short stories, 1965)
De tierra y escapularios (short stories, 1969)
La boca de la ballena (novel, 1973)
Fredi (novel, 1996)

References

External links

Argentine male novelists
Argentine male short story writers
Writers from Buenos Aires
1943 births
2006 deaths